The Åland Centre is an agrarian-centrist political party on the Åland Islands. The party was founded by Karl-Anders Bergman in 1976. At the 2003 election, the party won 24.1% of the popular vote and 7 out of 30 seats and became on a par with the Liberals of Åland. On 21 October 2007, parliamentary election, the party won 24.2% of the popular vote and 8 out of 30 seats. At the election in 2011 it became the strongest party with 23.6% and 7 out of 30 seats, but lost this position to the Liberals at the election in 2015 with 21.7% and 7 out of 30 seats.

The party is affiliated with the Alliance of Liberals and Democrats for Europe.

Mats Löfström, the current MP of the Åland Island in the parliament, represents Åland Centre.

References

External links 
Official web site 

Political parties in Åland
Nordic agrarian parties
Liberal parties in Finland
Centrist parties in Finland